Bariis may refer to:

 The Somali name for Rice
 Bariis iskukaris, a popular rice dish in Somali cuisine